Dandepallol is a village in Mancherial district of the Indian state of Telangana. It is located in Dandepalle mandal of Mancherial revenue division.

Before Mancherial district was created in 2016, Dandepalle was in Adilabad district.

Geography

References

External links
Maps of India: Adilabad District Map (Telangana)

Villages in Mancherial district
Mandal headquarters in Mancherial district